Lenora Methodist Episcopal Church is a historic church in Lenora, Minnesota, United States, an unincorporated community in Canton Township, Fillmore County.  It was added to the National Register of Historic Places in 1982.

History
The Minnesota conference of Methodism was organized in 1845, well before Minnesota became a territory in 1849.  The Reverend Benjamin Crist started visiting the Lenora area as a missionary on a circuit between Chatfield and Brownsville in 1854.  In 1856 Elder John L. Dyer officially organized the congregation.  He donated  of land and began construction of a stone building, financed by the sale of lots in the town of Lenora.  The Panic of 1857 thwarted the development of the area, though, and many pioneer families moved back east.  Dyer left the community and moved to Colorado, where he acquired the nickname "Snowshoe Preacher".

Construction on the church was stalled for the next eight years, with half-completed stone walls.  In 1865 the area was seeing financial prosperity again, and a stonemason used material from the large uncompleted church to finish building it as a smaller structure.  The church was opened in 1866 and dedicated by the Reverend Daniel Cobb.  The area never really prospered, though, since the railroad bypassed Lenora.  In the late 1920s, the Lenora church was closed as an active congregation.

Preservation
The church building has been preserved by a congregation in Newburg.  It is now known as the Lenora United Methodist Pioneer Center, and is open for occasional church services, special events, and concerts.  It appears much like it did in its pioneer days, with no electricity. Lighting is provided by two oil-fueled chandeliers and oil lamps in wall sconces.  Heat is provided by a wood stove, and a reed pump organ and the original wooden pews are still in place.

References

External links

 Historic Lenora Church in Fillmore County, Minnesota

Churches completed in 1856
Buildings and structures in Fillmore County, Minnesota
Methodist churches in Minnesota
Churches on the National Register of Historic Places in Minnesota
National Register of Historic Places in Fillmore County, Minnesota